The Spica class was a class of six fast torpedo boats built for the Swedish Navy in the 1960s and decommissioned in the late 1980s. One ship, is preserved as a museum ship in Stockholm, Sweden.

History

The ships were ordered in 1961 as part of a re-armament programme for defending Sweden's coastline. Tenders were sought from various European boat builders in the United Kingdom, Norway and Germany including Lurssen who offered the new Jaguar-class design. The Swedes ended up designing a bespoke vessel which became the template for subsequent Swedish fast attack craft.

Design

The hull was made of steel, unlike some other contemporary designs which used plywood. Although the boat had a relatively small hull and displacement, this provided a stable platform. The Bridge and Operations Room were located at the rolling and stamping centre of the ship which further improved stability for the crew especially in high seas. The boats were fitted with an NBC support system where the hull could be closed down in the event of having to operate in a nuclear fall-out area.

Machinery

The machinery consisted of three shafts powered by British built, Bristol Proteus gas turbines. Three MTU gas turbines were also installed as auxiliary generators

Armament

The torpedo armament consisted of six  torpedo tubes which were positioned at an angle. Hydrogen-peroxide propelled, wire guided torpedoes were used. The gun could engage both surface and airborne targets. There were also six  and four  rocket launchers capable of firing chaff, infrared countermeasures and illuminating projectiles (starshell). The torpedo boats had a scanning and a fire control radar with a basic fire control computer. There were plans to replace the torpedo tubes with anti-ship missiles in the 1980s but these plans were cancelled.

Ships

Survivors 
1 Spica-class torpedo boat is preserved as museum ship.

Surviving ships 
 HSwMS Spica in Vasa Museum, Karlskrona

Surviving parts 
 HSwMS Virgo in Slagsta Marina, Stockholm

References
 

 
Torpedo boat classes
Torpedo boats of the Cold War
Ships built in Sweden